Fort McClellan Army Airfield is a closed military airfield located  north-northeast of Anniston, Alabama, United States.

History 
The airfield was built in the 1930s to support Army activities at Fort McClellan, used by observation aircraft for artillery spotting and general surveillance of maneuvers. It was named in honor of Henry J. Reilly, a soldier and journalist.

In 1942–1943, the airfield was phased down and left unused for many years.

During the 1960s Vietnam War, the Army reactivated the airfield for used by helicopters and light observations aircraft.  It also hosted flights of CH-47 Chinooks from Fort Benning on maneuvers. It was used in support of the chemical and WAC facilities during the late 60s until at least late 1973. From 1975 to 1999, the airfield was used for defensive driving training by the Military Police School at Fort McClellan. Although unused, aerial imagery showed that the runways were intact in 2006.

As of 2021, Google satellite imagery shows construction crews demolishing the runways of the air field.

See also

 Alabama World War II Army Airfields

References 

 Abandoned Airfields: Fort McClellan Army Airfield

External links 
 Abandoned & Little-Known Airfields: Northeastern Alabama

Defunct airports in Alabama
Airports in Alabama
Transportation buildings and structures in Calhoun County, Alabama